Dorcadion aethiops is a species of beetle in the family Cerambycidae. It was described by Scopoli in 1763, originally under the genus Cerambyx. It is known from the Czech Republic, Albania, Greece, Bulgaria, Croatia, Hungary, Slovakia, North Macedonia, Romania, Austria, Turkey, Serbia, and Ukraine.

Subspecies
 Dorcadion aethiops aethiops (Scopoli, 1763)
 Dorcadion aethiops majoripenne Pic, 1926

See also 
Dorcadion

References

aethiops
Beetles described in 1763
Taxa named by Giovanni Antonio Scopoli